Cañada Nieto is a village in the Soriano Department of southwestern Uruguay.

Geography

History
On 22 September 1954 its status was elevated to "Pueblo" (village) by the Act of Ley Nº 12.137.

Population 
In 2011 Cañada Nieto had a population of 430.
 
Source: Instituto Nacional de Estadística de Uruguay

References

External links 
INE map of Cañada Nieto

Populated places in the Soriano Department